Pali is one of the bigger villages of Rewari district in Haryana state of India. The village is situated on NH 11 on Rewari Narnaul Road. It is also known for the work of the youth of the village who are on the mission to make the village clean and green. There is Punjab National Bannk,  Cooperative Bank,  Post office, Women Degree College, Sr.  Sec.  School, two private schools,  one college of education and Railway Station.

Wing Commander Manoj Kumar Yadav son of Sh. Jai Lal Yadav is first Commissioned Officer in Indian Air Force. He joined directly as Commissioned Officer in 2002.

This village is famous for 'Baba Neemadi Wala' temple located on the Hill.

Demographics 
In 2011 total population of this village is 3,666 of which 1923 are males while 1743 are females.

References 

Villages in Rewari district
this village have youth team for Clean drive, green plant other social activity.